Events from the year 1886 in the United States.

Incumbents

Federal Government 
 President: Grover Cleveland (D-New York)
 Vice President: vacant
 Chief Justice: Morrison Waite (Ohio)
 Speaker of the House of Representatives: John G. Carlisle (D-Kentucky)
 Congress: 49th

Events

 February 6–9 – Seattle riot of 1886: Anti-Chinese sentiments result in riots in Seattle, Washington.
 February 14 – The first train load of oranges leaves Los Angeles via the transcontinental railroad.
 March 17 – Carrollton Massacre: 20 African Americans are killed in Mississippi.
 April 24 – Father Augustine Tolton, the first Roman Catholic priest from the U.S. to identify himself publicly as African American, is ordained in Rome.
 May 1 – A general strike begins in the United States, which escalates on May 4 into the Haymarket affair in Chicago and eventually wins the eight-hour workday in the U.S.
 May 8 – Pharmacist Dr. John Stith Pemberton invents a carbonated beverage that will be named 'Coca-Cola'.
 May 17 – Santa Clara County v. Southern Pacific Railroad: The U.S. Supreme Court rules that corporations have the same rights as living persons.
 May 29 – Pharmacist John Pemberton begins to advertise Coca-Cola (advertisement in the Atlanta Journal).
 June 2 – U.S. President Grover Cleveland marries Frances Folsom in the White House, becoming the only president to wed in the executive mansion. She is 27 years his junior.
 June 9 – The centennial of the Stoughton Musical Society is celebrated.
 July 23 – Steve Brodie is reported to have made a jump from the Brooklyn Bridge, a claim subsequently disputed.
 August 20 – A massive hurricane demolishes the town of Indianola, Texas.
 August 31 – The 6.9–7.3  Charleston earthquake affects southeastern South Carolina with a maximum Mercalli intensity of X (Extreme). Sixty people are killed and damage is estimated at $5–6 million.
 September 4 – Indian Wars: After almost 30 years of fighting, Apache leader Geronimo surrenders with his last band of warriors to General Nelson Miles at Skeleton Canyon in Arizona.
 October 28 – In New York Harbor, U.S. President Grover Cleveland dedicates the Statue of Liberty.

Unknown Date 
Arthur Hinds & Company, now Barnes & Noble, is founded in New York City.

Ongoing
 Gilded Age (1869–c. 1896)

Sport 
October 23 - American Association's St. Louis Browns win the First (Unofficial) 1886 World Series by defeating the National League's Chicago White Stockings 4 games to 2. Final game was played at Sportsman's Park in St. Louis, Missouri

Births
 January 3 – John G. Fletcher, poet and author (died 1950)
 January 11 – Chester Conklin, comic film actor (died 1971)
 January 28 – Sam McDaniel, African-American actor (died 1962)
 February 27 – Hugo Black, U.S. Senator from Alabama from 1927 to 1937 and Associate Justice of the U.S. Supreme Court from 1937 to 1971 (died 1971)
 March 6
 Jam Handy, swimmer and water polo player (d. 1983)
 Nella Walker, actress and vaudevillian (d. 1971)
 March 7 – Jessie Coles Grayson, African American contralto and film actress (died 1953)
 March 8 – Edward Calvin Kendall, biochemist, recipient of the Nobel Prize in Physiology or Medicine in 1950 (died 1972)
 March 9 – Robert L. Eichelberger, general (died 1961)
 March 24 – Edward Weston, photographer (died 1958)
 April 2 – Reginald Barker, film director (died 1945)
 April 3 – Dooley Wilson, African American drummer, singer and actor (died 1953)
 April 8 – Margaret Ayer Barnes, playwright, novelist and short-story writer (died 1967)
 April 26 – Ma Rainey, born Gertrude Malissa Nix Pridgett, African American blues singer (died 1939)
 May 26 – Al Jolson, entertainer (died 1950)
 June 2 – Grover Whalen, politician (died 1962)
 June 3 – Benjamin McCandlish, Governor of Guam (died 1975)
 June 6 
 Tyler Brooke, actor and singer (died 1943)
 William A. Glassford, admiral (died 1958)
 June 27 
 Sally Crute, actress (died 1971)
 Carroll McComas, actress (d. 1962)
 June 29 – Robert C. Giffen, admiral (d. 1962)
 July 15 – Arthur L. Bristol, admiral (d. 1942)
 July 16 – Frank Hastings Griffin, engineer (d. 1974)
 September 11 – John H. Hester, general (d. 1976)
 September 28 – Alice Hollister, silent film actress (d. 1973)
 October 30 – Zoë Akins, dramatist (died 1958)
 November 9 
 Edward Lindberg, Olympic athlete (died 1978)
 Ed Wynn, actor (died 1966)
 December 5 – Rose Wilder Lane, journalist and libertarian (died 1968)
 December 9 – Clarence Birdseye, founder of the modern frozen food industry (died 1956)
 December 18 – Ty Cobb, baseball outfielder (died 1961)
 December 19 – Charles M. Cooke, Jr., admiral (died 1970)
 December 25 – Kid Ory, jazz trombonist and bandleader (died 1973)

Deaths
 January 13 – Thomas Wakeman, founded the first Sioux Indian YMCA (born 1846)
 January 22 – James T. Farley, U.S. Senator from California from 1879 to 1885. (born 1829)
 January 26 – David Rice Atchison, U.S. Senator from Missouri from 1844 to 1855 (born 1807)
 February 2 – David Hunter, Union Army general (born 1802)
 February 9 – Winfield Scott Hancock, Civil War Union general and political candidate (born 1824)
 February 12 – Horatio Seymour, 18th Governor of New York, Democratic Party nominee for President of the United States in the presidential election of 1868 (born 1810)
 March 8 – John Franklin Miller, U.S. Senator from California from 1881 to 1886 (born 1831)
 March 9 – Jerome B. Chaffee, U.S. Senator from Colorado from 1876 to 1879 (born 1825)
 March 13 – Austin Flint, co-founder of Buffalo Medical College and president of the American Medical Association (born 1812)
 April 3 – Arthur Pember, journalist, first president of The Football Association (born 1835 in the United Kingdom)
 April 27 – H. H. Richardson, architect (born 1838)
 May 15 – Emily Dickinson, poet (born 1830)
 May 21 – Stephen Pearl Andrews, anarchist and proponent of pantarchy (born 1812)
 June 26 – David Davis, U.S. Senator from Illinois from 1877 to 1883 (born 1815)
 July 16 – Ned Buntline (Edward Zane Carroll Judson Sr.), publisher, dime novelist and publicist (born 1821)
 August 4 – Samuel J. Tilden, 25th Governor of New York from 1875 to 1876 and 1876 Democratic presidential candidate (born 1814)
 August 5 – Robert Allen, Union army brigadier general (born 1811)
 August 10 – John W. Stevenson, U.S. Senator from Kentucky from 1871 to 1877 (born 1812)
 August 30 – Ferris Jacobs, Jr., politician (born 1836)
 October 10 – David Levy Yulee, U.S. Senator from Florida from 1845 to 1851 and from 1855 to 1861 (born 1810)
 November 18 – Chester A. Arthur, 21st President of the United States from 1881 to 1885, 20th Vice President of the United States from March to September 1881 (born 1829)
 November 21 – Charles Francis Adams Sr., United States Minister to the United Kingdom, son of John Quincy Adams (born 1807)
 December 26 – John A. Logan, U.S. Senator from Illinois from 1871 to 1877 (born 1826)

See also
Timeline of United States history (1860–1899)

External links
 

 
1880s in the United States
United States
United States
Years of the 19th century in the United States